Standard Chartered Zimbabwe (officially Standard Chartered Bank Zimbabwe Limited) is a commercial bank in Zimbabwe and a wholly owned subsidiary of Standard Chartered. It is licensed by the Reserve Bank of Zimbabwe, the central bank and national banking regulator.

Location
The headquarters and main branch of Standard Chartered Zimbabwe are located on the First Floor of the Africa Unity Square Building, at 68 Nelson Mandela Avenue, in downtown Harare, the capital and largest city of Zimbabwe.

Overview
Stanchart Zimbabwe is a large commercial bank, serving large corporate clients, upscale retail customers and medium to large business enterprises. As of December 2017, it had total assets that were valued at US$815.8 million with shareholders equity of US$84.6 million. , Standard Chartered Bank Zimbabwe employed 582 personnel.

History
Standard Chartered Bank Zimbabwe is the oldest financial institution in Zimbabwe, having been established as Standard Bank in 1892. The current bank was created when Standard Bank merged with Chartered Bank in 1969. According to the bank's website, Stanchart Zimbabwe served in excess of 90,000 account holders, as of May 2018.

Ownership
Stanchart Zimbabwe is a subsidiary of the Standard Chartered Bank Group, an International financial services conglomerate, headquartered in London in the United Kingdom, with operations in more than sixty countries and a network of over 1,700 branches, employing in excess of 86,000 people.

The shares of stock of Standard Chartered Zimbabwe, are owned by three corporate entities as illustrated in the table below, according to the bank's website.

Branches
As of May 2021, the bank maintained branches at the following locations:
 Africa Unity Square Branch: Corner of Sam Nujoma Street and Nelson Mandela Avenue, Harare Main Branch
 Bulawayo Branch: Corner of 8th Avenue and Fife Street, Bulawayo

Governance
As of December 2017, the chairman of the seven-person board of directors was L T Manasta, one of the non-Executive Directors. Ralph Watungwa serves as the bank's managing director and chief executive officer.

See also
 List of banks in Zimbabwe
 Standard Chartered Kenya
 Standard Chartered Bank
 Standard Chartered Tanzania
 Standard Chartered Uganda
 Standard Chartered Zambia
 Zimbabwe Stock Exchange
 Economy of Zimbabwe

References

External links
  Website of Standard Chartered Bank Zimbabwe
  Website of The Reserve Bank of Zimbabwe
 Zimbabwe: Clients Fume As Stanchart Closes Kwekwe Branch As of 13 March 2018.

Banks of Zimbabwe
Banks established in 1892
Standard Chartered
1892 establishments in the British Empire
Companies based in Harare